Mouhamed Dabo (born 2 January 1996) is a Senegalese footballer who plays as a midfielder for USL League One side Central Valley Fuego.

Career
Dabo began his career trialing with Arsenal prior to a three-year stint with the Inter Milan youth system.

Harrisburg City Islanders
Dabo earned his first professional contract with Harrisburg City Islanders competing in the United Soccer League ahead of the 2016 season. After earning 21 appearances his first season, Dabo was re-signed ahead of the 2017 season.

Pittsburgh Riverhounds SC
It was announced on 27 February 2018 that Dabo had signed for Pittsburgh Riverhounds SC of the United Soccer League after trialing with the club throughout the preseason.

Reno 1868
On 6 December 2019, it was announced that Dabo would move to Reno 1868 ahead of their 2020 season. Reno folded their team on November 6, 2020, due to the financial impact of the COVID-19 pandemic.

Central Valley Fuego
On 16 February 2022, Dabo signed with Central Valley Fuego ahead of their inaugural USL League One season.

References

External links

 
 Mouhamed Dabo's biography at Pittsburgh Riverhounds SC

1996 births
Living people
Senegalese footballers
Senegalese expatriate footballers
Expatriate soccer players in the United States
Penn FC players
Pittsburgh Riverhounds SC players
Reno 1868 FC players
Central Valley Fuego FC players
USL Championship players
Association football midfielders